Leandro Cejota Gracián (born 6 August 1982) is an Argentine retired footballer.

Career

Vélez Sarsfield
Gracián started his professional career with Vélez Sársfield where he was part of the team that won the Clausura 2005 tournament.

Monterrey
In 2006 Gracián joined Mexican Club de Futbol Monterrey.

Boca Juniors
In mid-2007, he joined Boca Juniors.

Loan spells
On 2 June 2009, Gracián moved out on loan to Aris Thessaloniki for 1 year, this being the first time he will compete in the European continent.

In January 2010 Boca Juniors loaned their attacking midfielder to Club Atlético Independiente until June 2010. The 27-year-old then returned from a loan spell in Greece at Aris Thessaloniki. On 7 January 2012, Gracián was sent to Colón de Santa Fe on a six-month loan deal.

Cobreloa
In mid-2012, as a free agent he signed for Cobreloa.

Querétaro
On 12 July 2013, Gracián joined the Mexican side Querétaro.

Honours

Club
Vélez Sársfield
Torneo de Clausura (1): 2005

Boca Juniors
Recopa Sudamericana (1): 2008
Torneo de Apertura (2): 2008, 2011

Independiente
Copa Sudamericana (1): 2010

References

External links
Leandro Gracián – Argentine Primera statistics at Fútbol XXI  
 

1982 births
Living people
Argentine footballers
Argentine expatriate footballers
Association football midfielders
Club Atlético Vélez Sarsfield footballers
Argentine people of Spanish descent
C.F. Monterrey players
Boca Juniors footballers
Cobreloa footballers
Club Atlético Independiente footballers
Club Atlético Colón footballers
Aris Thessaloniki F.C. players
Querétaro F.C. footballers
Deportivo Santaní players
Cúcuta Deportivo footballers
Club Rubio Ñu footballers
San Martín de Tucumán footballers
Chilean Primera División players
Argentine Primera División players
Liga MX players
Super League Greece players
Expatriate footballers in Chile
Expatriate footballers in Mexico
Expatriate footballers in Greece
Expatriate footballers in Paraguay
Expatriate footballers in Colombia
Footballers from Buenos Aires